The Ministry of Local Government is a ministry in Zambia. It is headed by the Minister of Local Government.

In 2012 the Environmental Protection portfolio was transferred to the Ministry of Natural Resources and Environmental Protection and the Early Education portfolio to the Ministry of Education, Science, Vocational Training and Early Education, with the department renamed the Ministry of Local Government and Housing.

In 2016 Housing was transferred from the local government portfolio to the Ministry of Housing and Infrastructure Development.

List of ministers

Deputy ministers

References

External links
Official website

Local government
Local government in Zambia
 
Zambia